Craig M. Gruber (June 15, 1951 – May 5, 2015) was an American rock bassist, best known as the original bassist in Rainbow. He also played in Elf, consisting of vocalist Ronnie James Dio, keyboardist Mickey Lee Soule, drummer Gary Driscoll and guitarist David Feinstein.

Biography
Elf released three albums before they joined Ritchie Blackmore in his newly formed band Rainbow in mid-1975. Gruber played on Rainbow's first album, Ritchie Blackmore's Rainbow. Soon after the album was released, Blackmore fired everyone except Dio.
Gruber was also in the early recording sessions on Black Sabbath's Heaven and Hell album, co-writing "Die Young," until Geezer Butler heard Dio, and returned to the band.

Gruber played live with Gary Moore on his supporting tour for his album Victims of the Future, and featured on Moore's 1984 live album We Want Moore! In 1980 he formed Bible Black with former Elf and Rainbow drummer Gary Driscoll. The band produced two albums before Driscoll's murder in 1987. Gruber had also been working on an Elf reunion, even though such a prospect seemed unlikely given the deaths of Driscoll and frontman Ronnie James Dio; both of whom had been members of the band from foundation until dissolution.

Early in 2010 Gruber formed "ED3N"- a metal band in the classic rock genre. The band featured vocalist Jeff Fenholt and guitarist David Shankle, of DSG and formerly Manowar.

Death
Craig Gruber died of prostate cancer in Florida on May 5, 2015, aged 63.

Discography

With Elf
 Carolina County Ball (1974)
 Trying to Burn the Sun (1975)

With Rainbow
 Ritchie Blackmore's Rainbow (1975)

With Ozz
 No Prisoners (1980)

With Bible Black
 Bible Black (1981)
 Ground Zero (1983)

With Gary Moore
 We Want Moore! (1984)
 Blinder (Ca. 1984)

With The Rods
 Heavier Than Thou (1986)

References

1951 births
2015 deaths
American rock bass guitarists
American heavy metal bass guitarists
American male bass guitarists
Rainbow (rock band) members
Black Sabbath members
The Gary Moore Band members
Deaths from prostate cancer
Deaths from cancer in Florida
American male guitarists
20th-century American bass guitarists
Elf (band) members